Jairo Aguirre Vargas (born 8 March 1956) is a Colombian former footballer who played as a striker.

Career
Aguirre played for Deportivo Pereira and Deportes Tolima.

He made two international appearances for Colombia, in 1984.

References

1956 births
Living people
Colombian footballers
Colombia international footballers
Deportivo Pereira footballers
Deportes Tolima footballers
Association football forwards
Deportivo Pereira managers